The 1951 Pro Bowl was the National Football League's inaugural Pro Bowl which featured the league's outstanding performers from the 1950 season. The game was played on Sunday, January 14, 1951, at the Los Angeles Memorial Coliseum in Los Angeles, California in front of 53,676 fans. The American Conference squad defeated the National Conference by a score of 28–27. The player were selected by a vote of each conferences coaches along with the sports editors of the newspapers in the Los Angeles area, where the game was contested.

The National team was led by the Los Angeles Rams' Joe Stydahar while Paul Brown of the Cleveland Browns coached the American stars. The same two coaches had faced each other three weeks earlier in the 1950 NFL Championship Game in which Brown's team had also defeated Stydahar's. Both coaches employed the T formation offense in the Pro Bowl.

Cleveland Browns quarterback Otto Graham was named the game's outstanding player.

Rosters
The 31-man Pro Bowl squads consisted of the following players:

Roster Notes:
Selected but did not play
Replacement selection due to injury or vacancy

Number of selections by team
Note: these numbers include players selected to the team but unable to play as well as replacements for these players, so there are more than 31 players in each conference.

References

Pro Bowl
Pro Bowl
Pro Bowl
Pro Bowl
American football competitions in Los Angeles
National Football League in Los Angeles
January 1951 sports events in the United States
1951 in sports in California